Allodiscocotylidae is a family of monogeneans within the order Mazocraeidea, containing 6 genera. Members of this family primarily host species of fish, such as Allodiscocotyla chorinemi hosting Scomberoides lysan.

Genera 

 Allodiscocotyla 
 Camopia 
 Hargicola 
 Metacamopia 
 Metacamopiella 
 Vallisia

References 

Platyhelminthes families
Polyopisthocotylea